Andrew Barlow or Andy Barlow may refer to:

 Andrew Barlow (1899–1961), Australian cricket umpire
 Andrew Henry Barlow (1837–1915), politician in Queensland, Australia
 Andy Barlow (footballer) (born 1965), English former professional footballer
 Andy Barlow (producer), British music producer